John Somerville (8 December 1939 – 12 November 1984) was an Australian rules footballer who played 106 senior games for the Essendon Football Club from 1960 to 1967.

Career 
Recruited from Moe Football Club, he played his first match for the Essendon senior team in Round 5 of the 1960 season, against Carlton, at Essendon's home ground, Windy Hill.

He played on the half-forward flank, kicking 96 goals in his 106 game career.

He played in the 1962 Essendon premiership team that beat Carlton 13.12 (90) to 8.10 (58).

1965 Preliminary Final 
Within the first 10 minutes of the 1965 Preliminary Final between Essendon and Collingwood Somerville was knocked unconscious by his opponent, the Collingwood half-back flanker Duncan Wright.

At the time, Wright and Somerville were some 90 metres behind the play and were isolated by some 30 metres from all other players, and were much closer to the boundary than they were to the central goal-to-goal line.

Somerville was so badly injured that he was taken off the field on a stretcher and was taken to hospital immediately. Due to the severity of his injuries, he was unable to play in the following week's Grand Final.

Essendon, backed by a now polarised crowd, went on to beat Collingwood 14.21 (105) to 6.6 (42).

Aftermath 
There was a public outcry; and the press was outraged:

The police (including the homicide squad) made some preliminary enquiries. The match officials, the field umpire Ron Brophy, the two boundary umpires, and the two goal umpires all claim to have seen nothing.

The field umpire, Ron Brophy, was never selected to umpire a VFL match again.

Wright, too, denied everything.

However, many years later, Wright openly admitted that he had indeed felled Somerville, and claimed that his actions had been in response to Somerville's niggling — which (Wright claimed) had started from the moment that the taller, far more skilful Somerville had been swapped over, by Essendon's coach John Coleman, from his selected position on the opposite half-forward flank, to play on Wright.

Wright, was renowned for his hot-headed violence:

The Collingwood coach, the tough champion rover, the highly talented boxer, and the scrupulously fair man Bob Rose was far from impressed with Wright's knockout; and, at Rose's behest, during the 1966 pre-season practice matches – that is, when the police, VFL and general social pressure on Collingwood and Wright had somewhat diminished – Wright was told, by football club secretary Jack Burns that his services were no longer required at Collingwood. He never played another VFL game.

After Essendon 
Somerville left Essendon at the end of 1967, and was appointed coach of Numurkah Football Club in 1968.

He is the father of Peter Somerville and Dean Somerville

Notes

References 
 Hansen, B. & Dyer, J., "Ron Brophy, the Larrikin Ump!", pp. 98–121 in Hansen, B. & Dyer, J., The Wild Men of Football, Volume III: If Ya Don't Mind Umpire!, B.E. Hansen, (Mount Waverley), 1995. 
 Maplestone, M., Flying Higher: History of the Essendon Football Club 1872-1996, Essendon Football Club, (Melbourne), 1996. 
 Miller, W., Petraitis, V. & Jeremiah, V., The Great John Coleman, Nivar Press, (Cheltenham), 1997. 
 Ross, J. (ed), 100 Years of Australian Football 1897-1996: The Complete Story of the AFL, All the Big Stories, All the Great Pictures, All the Champions, Every AFL Season Reported, Viking, (Ringwood), 1996. 
 Strevens, S., Bob Rose: A Dignified Life, Allen & Unwin, (Crows Nest), 2004.

External links

Steve Strevens, "A finals clash not for the faint-hearted" (The Age, Melbourne, 20 September 2003)

1939 births
1984 deaths
Australian rules footballers from Victoria (Australia)
Essendon Football Club players
Essendon Football Club Premiership players
Moe Football Club players
One-time VFL/AFL Premiership players